"Psych Out!" is a song by British rapper AJ Tracey. It was released independently as a single on 17 January 2019, peaking at number 18 on the UK chart. The song was produced by Rex Kudo and Charlie Handsome.

In September 2019, the British Phonographic Industry certified the song as Silver for exceeding chart sales of 200,000.

Track listing

Charts

Certifications

References

2019 singles
2019 songs
AJ Tracey songs
Songs written by AJ Tracey